Sarina Isabel Calpo Bolden (born June 30, 1996) is a professional footballer who plays as a midfielder for A-League Women club Western Sydney Wanderers. Born in the United States, she represents the Philippines women's national team.

Early life
Sarina Isabel Bolden was born on June 30, 1996 in Santa Clara, California, U.S. to Sherry and Robert Bolden and has a younger brother. She attended Milpitas High School where she played for its women's soccer and softball teams.

With the Milpitas High School Trojans, Bolden led her high school team to the 2015 SCVAL El Camino Division title. She was named as part of the first team All-SCVAL selection for three years from 2013 to 2015. In the club level, Bolden played for MLVA Mercury Black '96 helping the club reach the 2014 ECNL National Playoffs and helped the Denza Force '95 win the 2013 and 2015 ECNL North West Conference championships.

Collegiate career
Bolden attends the Loyola Marymount University where she plays for the school's women's soccer team. In 2016 she scored six goals for her college team and she was named as part of the All-West Coast Conference First Team and the NSCAA All-West Region.

Club career
Bolden in 2020 played for Xinbei Hangyuan in the Taiwan Mulan Football League. She later played for the San Francisco Nighthawks of the Women's Premier Soccer League in the United States.

In June 2021, Bolden was signed in by Elfen Saitama of the WE League of Japan. She debuted in Saitama's 1–4 lost to Tokyo Verdy Beleza on October 10, 2021, after she was brought in as a substitute in the 62nd minute.

In December 2022, Bolden mutually terminated her contract with Elfen Saitama and transferred to Australian club Western Sydney Wanderers.

International career
Bolden's performance with the Loyola Marymount University women's soccer team led to her being invited to participate in a training camp in Orlando, Florida in April 2017 which was organized by the United States women's national under-23 soccer team. In late 2017, she was able to participate in training camps organized by the Philippines women's national football team and caught the attention of Richard Boon, then head coach of the national team. She was later named in the final line up for the Philippine national team that participated at the 2018 AFC Women's Asian Cup.

In the Philippines' first group stage match against host Jordan, Bolden had her first international cap. She scored the winning goal for the Philippines in their 2–1 victory against the hosts.

Bolden was named in the line up for the Philippine national team that participated at the 2022 AFC Women's Asian Cup. The Philippines advanced to the knockout stage of the AFC Women's Asian Cup for the first time. During the quarterfinals against Chinese Taipei, which ended in a penalty shoot-out following a 1–1 draw, Bolden scored the winning penalty which resulted in the Philippines qualifying for their first-ever FIFA Women's World Cup, the 2023 edition.

International goals
Scores and results list the Philippines' goal tally first.

Honours
Philippines
Southeast Asian Games third place: 2021
AFF Women's Championship: 2022

Personal life
Bolden's cousins Jalen Brown and Ryanne Brown are also professional footballers.

References

External links

1996 births
Living people
Citizens of the Philippines through descent
Filipino women's footballers
Women's association football midfielders
Philippines women's international footballers
Filipino expatriate footballers
Filipino expatriate sportspeople in Sweden
Expatriate women's footballers in Sweden
Filipino people of African-American descent
American women's soccer players
Soccer players from California
Sportspeople from Santa Clara, California
People from Milpitas, California
American sportspeople of Filipino descent
Loyola Marymount Lions women's soccer players
Chifure AS Elfen Saitama players
Western Sydney Wanderers FC (A-League Women) players
American expatriate women's soccer players
American expatriate sportspeople in Sweden
Competitors at the 2019 Southeast Asian Games
WE League players
African-American women's soccer players
Southeast Asian Games bronze medalists for the Philippines
Southeast Asian Games medalists in football
Competitors at the 2021 Southeast Asian Games